The 1962 Wittenberg Tigers football team was an American football team that represented Wittenberg University in the Ohio Athletic Conference (OAC) during the 1962 NCAA College Division football season. In their eighth year under head coach Bill Edwards, the Tigers compiled a perfect 9–0 record and won the OAC championship.

In the final Associated Press (AP) small college poll, Florida A&M edged Wittenberg by a narrow margin of 67 points to 66. In the final UPI coaches poll, Wittenberg was ranked fifth.

Six Wittenberg players were selected by the Associated Press as first-team players on the 1962 All-OAC football team: sophomore quarterback Charles Green; senior end Bill McCrory; junior defensive end Jim Worden; junior defensive tackle Al Capauano; senior linebacker Jack Spohn; and senior defensive halfback Hoy Allen.

Schedule

References

Wittenberg
Wittenberg Tigers football seasons
College football undefeated seasons
Wittenberg Tigers football